Fifteen Years War may refer to:

 Long Turkish War, 1591–1606 war between the Habsburg Monarchy and the Ottoman Empire
 Pacific War, conflicts involving Japan from the Mukden Incident in Manchuria in 1931 through the end of World War II in 1945

See also
 Mukden Incident, a false flag event staged by Japanese military personnel in Manchuria in 1931
 Second Sino-Japanese War, conflict primarily between the Republic of China and the Empire of Japan in 1937–1945
 First Peloponnesian War, 460–445 BC fighting between Sparta and Athens, along with allies on both sides
 Thirteen Years' War (disambiguation)